William Dykes is the name of:

Spike Dykes (William Taylor Dykes, 1938–2017), American football coach
W. E. "Bill" Dykes (1925–2015)
Bill Dykes (born 1946), American gospel music singer
William Rickatson Dykes (1877–1925), English botanist (mainly Irises)

See also
William Dyke (disambiguation)